Glaphyra (or Glafira ; Greek: Γλαφύρα) is a Greek feminine given name. It is derived from Greek γλαφυρός (glaphyros) meaning "hollowed" or "polished, elegant". The Slavic and Italian names Glafira are derived from it.

Persons bearing the name include:
Glaphyra, Cappadocian princess
Glaphyra (hetaera), ancient Greek courtesan
Glafira Alymova, Russian noblewoman and harpist
Glafira Deomidova, Russian soprano
Glafira Dorosh, Ukrainian cook
Glafira Martinovich, Belarusian gymnast
Glafira Tarkhanova, Russian actress

Footnotes

Feminine given names